New Year's Evil is an annual professional wrestling television special produced by the American promotion WWE as part of their NXT brand division. The event's name was originally established by rival World Championship Wrestling (WCW) on the December 27, 1999 episode of Monday Nitro. After the WWE (then the World Wrestling Federation) acquired the WCW trademarks in 2001, the event was revived in 2021 and airs every January as celebration of New Year's.

Events

References

External links 
 

Recurring events established in 2021
WWE NXT
World Championship Wrestling shows